The men's light heavyweight event was part of the boxing programme at the 1988 Summer Olympics. The weight class allowed boxers of up to 81 kilograms to compete. The competition was held from 21 September to 2 October 1988. 26 boxers from 26 nations competed. Andrew Maynard won the gold medal.

Medalists

Results
The following boxers took part in the event:

First round
 Ahmed El-Naggar (EGY) def. Hudson Nanton (SVI), walk-over
 Niels Madsen (DEN) def. Terry Dixon (JAM), RSC-2
 Henryk Petrich (POL) def. Park Byun-Jin (KOR), RSC-2
 Osmond Imadiyi (NGA) def. Rund Kanika (ZAI), KO-1
 Damir Škaro (YUG) def. Deyan Kirilov (BUL), 3:2
 Sione Vaveni Talia'uli (TNG) def. Tommy Bauro (SIS), KO-1
 Joseph Akhasamba (KEN) def. Jeffrey Nedd (ARU), RSC-2
 Andrea Magi (ITA) def. Pua Ulberg (SAM), 5:0
 Brent Kosolofski (CAN) def. Ahmed el-Masri (LEB), RSC-3
 Markus Bott (FRG) def. René Suetovius (GDR), RSC-3
 Nurmagomed Shanavazov (URS) def. Patrick Lihanda (UGA), 3:2

Second round
 Lajos Eros (HUN) def. Nelson Adams (PUR), 4:1
 Andrew Maynard (USA) def. Mika Masoe (ASA), RSC-2
 Ahmed El-Naggar (EGY) def. Chris Collins (GRN), 5:0
 Henryk Petrich (POL) def. Niels Madsen (DEN), 5:0
 Damir Škaro (YUG) def. Osmond Imadiyi (NGA), 5:0
 Joseph Akhasamba (KEN) def. Sione Vaveni Talia'uli (TNG), 5:0
 Andrea Magi (ITA) def. Brent Kosolofski (CAN), 4:1
 Nurmagomed Shanavazov (URS) def. Markus Bott (FRG), 5:0

Quarterfinals
 Andrew Maynard (USA) def. Lajos Eros (HUN), 5:0
 Henryk Petrich (POL) def. Ahmed Elnaggar (EGY), 5:0
 Damir Škaro (YUG) def. Joseph Akhasamba (KEN), 5:0
 Nurmagomed Shanavazov (URS) def. Andrea Magi (ITA), 5:0

Semifinals
 Andrew Maynard (USA) def. Henryk Petrich (POL), AB-3
 Nurmagomed Shanavazov (URS) def. Damir Škaro (YUG), walk-over

Final
 Andrew Maynard (USA) def. Nurmagomed Shanavazov (URS), 5:0

References

Light Heavyweight